Thai Australians refers to Australians who trace their ancestry to Thailand or Thais who trace their ancestry to Australia. The Australian census recorded 45,635 Australians with Thai ancestry in the 2011 census.

History of Immigration from Thailand

In 1911, the master of the Thai royal stables visited Australia and bought 126 horses. This started a trend of royal envoys from Thailand visiting Australia on horse-buying and other economic missions.

Melbourne's Museum Victoria (2013) reveals that the first notable Thai to arrive in Australia was Butra Mahintra, sent by King Rama VI during the early 1920s to purchase racehorses. Connections with Thai royalty developed further with the arrival of Prince Purachatra in 1927, leading a group to observe Australian agriculture and infrastructure

The number of Thais officially counted in New South Wales stayed under 50 until the 1950s. In January 1950, the Australian government launched the Colombo Plan, an aid program for sponsoring Asian students to study or train in Australian tertiary institutions. The main objectives of the plan were to dispel the negative impression of Asian countries toward the White Australia Policy and to counter communism in Asia. Students from developing countries were brought to Australia to study. The idea was that when they had finished their studies students would return to use the skills and knowledge they had acquired to help their own people. Approximately 450 Thai students travelled to Australia on the Colombo Plan between 1954 and 1989. Most did not settle in Australia permanently, but they increased awareness of Australia when they returned to Thailand. Between the 1950s and 1970s the majority of new arrivals from Thailand in Australia continued to be students, as well as spouses of Australians and those sponsored under military traineeships.

The number of migrants in Australia grew significantly when the Immigration Restriction Act was repealed in 1973. In 1975, Australia accepted many Vietnamese, Lao and Cambodian refugees for settlement. Included in this group of Indochinese refugees were non-Thais born inside Thailand. By 1986, the Thailand-born population in Australia had risen to 6,998 people, but only half of these were of Thai ancestry. This means that the Thai-born population of Thai ancestry in Australia at that time was less than one-twelfth of today's figure.

The latest Census in 2011 recorded 45,465 Thailand-born people in Australia, an increase of 48.8 per cent from the 2006 Census. The 2011 distribution by state and territory showed New South Wales had the largest number with 17,541, followed by Victoria (10,766), Queensland (7,022) and Western Australia (5,662). Among the total Thailand-born in Australia at the 2011 Census, 23.1 per cent arrived between 2001 and 2006 and 32.8 per cent arrived between 2006 and 2011.

Thailand-Born Resident Population in Australia

Estimated Thailand-Born Resident Population, by State, 1996–2016

Estimated Thailand-Born Resident Population, 1992 to 2014

Notable Thai Australians
Kenneth Dougall, Australian soccerplayer
 Geoff Huegill, swimmer
 Anchilee Scott-Kemmis, Miss Universe Thailand 2021
 Mechai Viravaidya, politician and activist
 Chai Romruen, actor
 Marion Grasby, TV presenter, cookbook author and food journalist
 Sudjai Cook, Australian rules footballer
 Adam Aitken, Australian poet
 Gemma Pranita, actress
 Phon Martdee, Muay Thai instructor & promoter
 Jackie Barnes, musician
 Mahalia Barnes, singer-songwriter
Paula Taylor, model, actress, TV host, and former Channel [V] VJ

See also

 Australia–Thailand relations
 Australians in Thailand
 Thai Town, Sydney
 Thai people
 Asian Australians
 Siam
 Thailand
 Immigration to Australia

References

External links
Pai Nai Ma: Thai Australian Experiences (online exhibition)
Australia-Thailand Institute

Asian Australian
Immigration to Australia
 
 
Thai-Australian culture